Bane is a small remote settlement on the Rute Plateau in the hills west of Velike Lašče in Slovenia. The entire Municipality of Velike Lašče is part of the traditional region of Lower Carniola and is now included in the Central Slovenia Statistical Region.

Name
Bane was attested in historical sources as Wan in 1425 and Wann in 1431.

References

External links

Bane on Geopedia

Populated places in the Municipality of Velike Lašče